Reginald Evans (27 March 1928 – 7 February 2009) was a British-born actor active in Australian radio, theatre, television and cinema from the 1960s, after having started his career in his native England.

Biography 

Evans started drama while in the Royal Air Force stationed near Oxford, England, after which he studied at the London Academy of Music and Dramatic Art, followed by work in repertory theatre. He toured Europe with the New Park Theatre Club and later became its artistic director.

Evans immigrated to Australia in the 1960s and worked in commercial radio and toured with the theatre company the Young Elizabethan Players. 

His many Australian television roles include guest roles in Homicide,  Skippy the Bush Kangaroo, Number 96, Division 4, Spyforce, The Evil Touch, A Time for Love, Behind the Legend, Comedy Playhouse, and The Hour Before My Brother Dies.
 
In 1980, Evans featured in the Australian version of British Serial Are You Being Served?

Evans' film credits include Mad Dog Morgan (1976), the Station Master in Mad Max (1979), a pirate in The Island (1980), Manganinnie (1980), The Plains of Heaven (1982), Kitty and the Bagman (1983), Strikebound (1984), My Letter to George (1986) and Celia (1989).

Evans played several roles in serial in Prisoner He played three previous guest roles in Prisoner. These were a colleague at electrician Eddie Cook's electrical firm in 1979, the foreman at the printshop where inmate Bea Smith does her work release in 1982, and as Foxy, an old friend of Lizzie Birdsworth's, in 1983. Before taking the permanent role of Detective Howard Simmons in 1985.

Evans appeared in series Blue Heelers as Keith Purvis in the 1990s. In 2005, he returned to Blue Heelers in a smaller guest role. His final role was a part in film Charlie and Boots

Partial filmography
Stone (1974) – Solicitor
Mad Dog Morgan (1976) – Bob
Deathcheaters (1976) – Army Sergeant
Raw Deal (1977) – Carpenter
Mad Max (1979) – Station Master
The Island (1980) – Jack the Bat
Manganinnie (1980) – Quinn
Gallipoli (1981) – Athletics Official 1
The Plains of Heaven (1982) – Cunningham
Kitty and the Bagman (1983) – Chicka
Strikebound (1984) – Ernie
My Letter to George (1985) – Mr. Simmons
Evil Angels (1988) – The Jury (Foreman)
Celia (1989) – Jack
Father (1990) – Old Charlie
Heaven Tonight (1990) – Norm Jenkins
Flynn (1993) – Hobo
Muggers (2000) – Crawford
Japanese Story (2003) – Bloke in Row Boat
The Honourable Wally Norman (2003) – Barry
Dying Breed (2008) – Alfred
Charlie & Boots (2009) – Mack (final film role)

Death
Evans and his partner, Angela Brunton, died in the 2009 Victorian bushfires.

References

External links
 

1928 births
2009 deaths
Male actors from London
Welsh male television actors
Welsh male film actors
Accidental deaths in Victoria (Australia)
Australian male film actors
Australian male television actors
Welsh emigrants to Australia
Natural disaster deaths in Australia